The 1950 Grand Prix motorcycle racing season was the second F.I.M. Road Racing World Championship Grand Prix season. The season consisted of six Grand Prix races in five classes: 500cc, 350cc, 250cc, 125cc and Sidecars 600cc. It began on 10 June, with Isle of Man TT and ended with Nations Grand Prix on 10 September.

1950 Grand Prix season calendar

Standings

Scoring system
Points were awarded to the top six finishers in each race. All rounds counted towards the championship in the 125cc and Sidecars, the best three races counted in the 250cc, while in the 350cc and 500cc championships, only the best four results counted.

500cc final standings

Constructors' 500cc World Championship

1950 350cc Roadracing World Championship final standings

1950 250cc Roadracing World Championship final standings

1950 125cc Roadracing World Championship final standings

References

 Büla, Maurice & Schertenleib, Jean-Claude (2001). Continental Circus 1949–2000. Chronosports S.A. 

Grand Prix motorcycle racing seasons
Grand Prix motorcycle racing season